General Marbot may refer to:

Adolphe Marbot (1781–1844), French Army brigadier general
Jean-Antoine Marbot (1754–1800), French Republic general
Marcellin Marbot (1782–1854), French Republic general